Zayed bin Sultan Al Nahyan (1918–2004) was ruler of Abu Dhabi and Founding Father of the United Arab Emirates.

Zayed may also refer to:

People
 Zayed bin Khalifa Al Nahyan (1835–1909), or Zayed the Great, grandfather of Sheikh Zayed bin Sultan
 Zayed Khan (born 1980), Indian actor and producer
 Zayed Khan (Bangladeshi actor) (fl. from 2006)
 Éamon Zayed (born 1983), Irish-Libyan footballer

Places 
 Zayed City, Abu Dhabi, UAE
 Zayed University, in the UAE

See also 

 Zaid and Zayd, an Arabic masculine name
 Ziad, an Arabic given name and surname
 Order of Zayed, UAE's highest civil decoration